The Halifax Historical Museum displays local history from 5,000 BC to the present day in a National Register of Historic Places listed building designed by Wilbur B. Talley in Daytona Beach, Florida, United States. The museum is housed in the former Merchants Bank building (1910), added to the U.S. National Register of Historic Places on January 6, 1986. It is located at 252 South Beach Street.

References

External links
 
 Halifax Historical Museum (official website)
 Volusia County listings at National Register of Historic Places
 Florida's Office of Cultural and Historical Programs
 Volusia County listings 
 Halifax Historical Museum

History museums in Florida
Museums in Daytona Beach, Florida
National Register of Historic Places in Volusia County, Florida